The Moro people or Bangsamoro people are the 13 Muslim-majority ethnolinguistic Austronesian groups of Mindanao, Sulu, and Palawan, native to the region known as the Bangsamoro (lit. Moro nation or Moro country).  As Muslim-majority ethnic groups, they form the largest non-Christian population in the Philippines, and comprise about 5% of the country's total population, or 5 million people.

Most Moros are followers of Sunni Islam of the Shafiʽi school of fiqh. The Moros were once independent under a variety of local states, including the Sultanate of Sulu, the Sultanate of Maguindanao, and the Confederation of sultanates in Lanao; withstanding repeated Spanish invasions, the Moro states remained de facto independent up until the Moro Rebellion of the early 20th century. Upon Philippine independence in 1946, the Moros continued their struggle for self-determination against a predominantly–Christian Philippines, culminating in a decades-long insurgency of armed rebel groups, chief among them the Moro National Liberation Front (MNLF) and the Moro Islamic Liberation Front (MILF), against the Armed Forces of the Philippines.

The Moro people are guaranteed an autonomous region by the Constitution of the Philippines; the establishment of the Autonomous Region in Muslim Mindanao however did not satisfy the demands of rebel groups. A ceasefire and successful peace talks between the Philippine government and the MILF led to the creation in 2018 of a region with greater political autonomy and powers, known as the Bangsamoro Autonomous Region in Muslim Mindanao.

Today, outside of the Bangsamoro autonomous region, the Moro people are a significant minority in other nearby provinces in Southern Mindanao and in the province of Palawan, Samar, Bicol Region, and are a visible and integrated minority in various urban centers of the country, such as Manila, Cebu, and Davao. Outside of the Philippines, some Moros remain in areas once controlled by the Sulu Sultanate along the eastern coast of Sabah; others emigrated to neighboring Malaysia, Indonesia and Brunei in the late 20th century due to the Moro conflict in Mindanao. Newer communities can be found today in Kota Kinabalu, Sandakan, and Semporna in Sabah, Malaysia, North Kalimantan in Indonesia, and in Bandar Seri Begawan, Brunei.

Etymology 

The word Moro (a cognate of the English "Moors") originates as an exonym which, prior to the Spaniards' arrival in the Philippine archipelago, came to be used by the Spanish in reference to Muslims in general. The term originates from "Mauru", a Latin word that referred to the inhabitants of the ancient Roman province of Mauritania in northwest Africa, which today comprises the modern Muslim states  of Morocco. With the rise of Mauritania as part of the Muslim Umayyad Caliphate, Muslim armies conquered and ruled much of the Iberian Peninsula from 711 to 1492, for about a total of 781 years in which Christians became involved in conflicts to reclaim Iberia. The term came to be extended to Muslims in general. The term was similarly applied by the Spanish to the Muslim communities they found in parts of the Philippine archipelago when they arrived.

In their struggle for self-determination, the term was later adopted in the names for separatist organizations such as the Moro National Liberation Front (MNLF), Rashid Lucman's Bangsa Moro Liberation Organisation (BMLO) as well the Moro Islamic Liberation Front (MILF).

The recently coined term "Bangsamoro" is derived from the Malay word "bangsa", (originally meaning "nation" but altered to denote "race" in colonial times) with the "Moro" as "people" and may also be used to describe both the Muslim-majority ethnolinguistic groups and their homeland. The Framework Agreement on the Bangsamoro recognizes "Bangsamoro" as an identity and called for the creation of a new autonomous political entity called Bangsamoro.

Though the term may carry some derogatory connations by some, the term Moro has evolved to become seen as a unitary force especially by the Philippine government, despite opposition from some of the modern Muslim communities in the Philippines who object to the term's origin with the Spanish colonial era. Marvic Leonen, who was the Chief Peace Negotiator for Philippine government with the Moro Islamic Liberation Front, has said:

Ethnic groups 
The Muslim-majority Philippine ethnic groups according to the Bureau on Cultural Heritage (BCH) of Bangsamoro include:

 Badjao
 Iranun
 Jama Mapun
 Kalagan
 Kalibugan
 Maguindanao
 Maranaw
 Palawanon
 Molbog
 Sama
 Sangil
 Tausūg
 Yakan

Society

Region 

The majority of the Moro people historically reside in the area now called the Bangsamoro region which was commonly called Muslim Mindanao in 1989 when the ARMM was created. That land is located in the provinces of Basilan, Cotabato, Compostela Valley, Davao del Sur, Lanao del Norte, Lanao del Sur, Maguindanao, Palawan, Sarangani, South Cotabato, Sultan Kudarat and Sulu, Tawi-Tawi. It includes the cities of Cotabato, Dapitan, Dipolog, General Santos, Iligan, Marawi. The eastern part of a territory of the former British protectorate in North Borneo (now in the eastern Sabah), which have since become part of the federation of Malaysia, is also claimed by the Moro National Liberation Front for the proposed state of Bangsamoro Republik. However, the idea has failed since the MNLF founding leader Misuari self-exiled himself after clashing with the government in 2013 in Zamboanga City, as he protested the further unilateral changes by the government on the mutually signed 1996 Final Peace Agreement. Misuari was labelled as a "terrorist" during the siege.

On 5 August 2008, after nearly 10 years of negotiation, with all Thebes's associated international bodies all ready to witness a supposed historic event, an attempt by the Philippine government's Peace Negotiating Panel to sign a Memorandum of Agreement on Ancestral Domain with the Moro Islamic Liberation Front through a petition by Settler politicians in Mindanao like Governor Manny Pinol and Governor Lobregat, was then declared unconstitutional by the Philippine Supreme Court. Conflict immediately broke out on the ground following the decision, with nearly half a million people displaced and hundreds killed. Observers now concur that two Moro commanders — Kumander Umbra Kato and Kumander Bravo — did launch attacks in Lanao del Norte and North Cotabato as a response to the non-signing that has shaken the peace process in the region.

The Framework Agreement on the Bangsamoro defines the Bangsamoro to be  who at the time of conquest and colonization were considered natives or original inhabitants of Mindanao and the Sulu archipelago and its adjacent islands including Palawan, and their descendants whether of mixed or of full blood".

Culture 

Islam is the most dominant influence on the Moro cultures since the era of the Sultanate of Maguindanao and Sulu. Large and small mosques can be found all over the region. In accordance with Islamic Law, alcohol consumption must be avoided at all cost, fornication is prohibited. Pork and pork byproducts are not permissible. Fasting during Ramadan and providing charity for the poor are mandatory in Islam. The Hajj is also a major requirement as it is one of the five pillars of Islam. Moro women cover themselves using a veil (tudong) just as in Malaysia, Indonesia, Brunei, Singapore and southern Thailand. Moro men, especially the elderly, can always be seen wearing a black skull cap called the songkok or the white one called the taqiyah. Differentiating from their Malay relatives in neighboring countries, the only main problems associated with Moro groups is that they are not always united and lack a sense of solidarity.

Music 

The culture of the Moros of Mindanao revolves around the music of the kulintang, a type of gong instrument, akin to the drum instrument, yet wholly made of bronze or brass found in the southern Philippines. This creates a unique sound that varies in the speed it is hit which includes the Binalig, Tagonggo and the Kapanirong plus others more also normally heard in Malaysia, Indonesia and Brunei.

Education 
Generally, Moros are educated. While the majority of Moros attend both government and private educational institutions especially in key cities such as Davao, Cebu and Manila, some may choose formal Islamic education and are enrolled in Islamic/Arabic institutions like the Jamiatul Mindanao Al-Islamie in Marawi City. At the tertiary level, there are government and privately run educational institutions in the traditionally Moro-inhabited areas. In Marawi, many attend Mindanao State University, the second-biggest state university in the Philippines next to University of the Philippines, which has several campuses across Mindanao. Mindanao State University also has an Islamic Institute within its campus (the King Faisal Centre for Islamic Arabic, Asian Studies). With the assistance of scholarship grants, some even attend university outside the country.

History

Early history 

In the 13th century, the arrival of Muslim missionaries, in particular Makhdum Karim, in Tawi-Tawi initiated the conversion of the native population to Islam. Trade between other sultanates in Brunei, Malaysia and Indonesia helped establish and entrench the Islamic religion in the southern Philippines. In 1457, the introduction of Islam led to the creation of Sultanates. This included Rajah Buayan, the Sultanate of Maguindanao and the Sultanate of Sulu, which is considered the oldest Muslim government in the region until its annexation by the United States in 1898.

Like Bruneian Empire, Sulu and other Muslim sultanates in the Philippines were introduced to Islam through Chinese Muslims, Persians, and Arab traders. Chinese Muslim merchants participated in the local commerce, and the Sultanate had diplomatic relations with Ming China. As it was involved in the tribute system, the Sulu leader Paduka Batara and his sons moved to China, where he died and Chinese Muslims subsequently brought up his sons. The inhabitants of pre-Hispanic Philippines practised Islam and animism. The Malay kingdoms interacted, and traded with various tribes throughout the islands, governing several territories ruled by leaders called rajah, datu and sultan. Before the arrival of Islam, rajahs and datus governed the territories.

Colonial period

Spanish conquest 

In 1519, the Spanish expedition to the East Indies began in search for a westward route to the Maluku Islands (the "Spice Islands"), led by Portuguese explorer Ferdinand Magellan. The fleet reached the Philippine archipelago in March 1521 where Magellan was to die during the Battle of Mactan and before the expedition's successful circumnavigation and return. Several subsequent expeditions to the islands were sent until the 1564 Miguel Lopez de Legazpi was successful, marking the start of Spanish colonization of what is now the Philippines in 1565.

The sultanates, however, actively resisted the Spaniards. With intentions of pacifying the islands, the Spaniards made incursions into Moro territory. They also began erecting military stations and garrisons with Catholic missions, which attracted Christianised natives of civilian settlements. The most notable of these are Zamboanga and Cotabato. Spain was in the midst of the Inquisition which required Jews and Muslims to convert to Roman Catholicism or leave or face the death penalty; thus Spaniards tried to ban and suppress Islam in areas they conquered. Feeling threatened by these actions, the Moros decided to challenge the Spanish government. They began conducting raids on Catholic coastal towns. These Moro raids reached a fevered pitched during the reign of Datu Bantilan in 1754.

The Spanish–Moro Conflict started at the phase of Castille War (Spanish-Bruneian War) of 1578, which created the war between Spaniards and Moros in areas held by Sultanate of Brunei, lasted several hundred years, while the Castille War itself lasted only two months. The string of coastal fortifications, military garrisons and forts built by the Spaniards ensured that these raids, although destructive to the Philippine economies of the coastal settlements, were eventually stifled. The advent of steam-powered naval ships in the 1800s finally drove the antiquated Moro navy of colorful proas and vintas to their bases. It took at least two decades of the presence of the Spanish in the Philippines for them to launch an extensive conquest of Mindanao. The Sultanate of Sulu, one of the last Sultanates existing, itself soon fell under a concerted naval and ground attack from Spanish forces. In the last quarter of the 19th century Moros in the Sultanate of Sulu allowed the Spanish to build forts, but these areas remained loosely controlled by the Spanish as their sovereignty was limited to military stations and garrisons and pockets of civilian resettlements in Zamboanga and Cotabato (the latter under the Sultanate of Maguindanao), until the Spanish had to abandon the region as a consequence of their defeat in the Spanish–American War. Before that, in order to retain independence, the Sultanate of Sulu had given up its rule over Palawan to Spain in 1705 and Basilan to Spain in 1762; the areas that the Sulu Sultanate gave partial rule to Spain are Sulu and Tawi-Tawi.

In 1876, the Spaniards launched a campaign to placate Jolo and made a final bid to establish a government in the southern islands. On 21 February of that year, the Spaniards assembled the largest contingent in Jolo, consisting of 9,000 soldiers in 11 transports, 11 gunboats and 11 steamboats. José Malcampo occupied Jolo and established a Spanish settlement with Pascual Cervera appointed to set up a garrison and serve as military governor. He served from March 1876 to December 1876 and was followed by José Paulin (December 1876 – April 1877), Carlos Martínez (September 1877 – February 1880), Rafael de Rivera (1880–1881), Isidro G. Soto (1881–1882), Eduardo Bremon, (1882), Julian Parrrado (1882–1884), Francisco Castilla (1884–1886), Juan Arolas (1886–1893), Caésar Mattos (1893), Venancio Hernández (1893–1896) and Luis Huerta (1896–1899).

The Chinese sold small arms like Enfield and Spencer Rifles to the Buayan Sultanate of Datu Uto. They were used to battle the Spanish invasion of the Sultanate of Buayan. The Datu paid for the weapons in slaves.

The population of Chinese in Mindanao in the 1880s was 1,000. The Chinese ran guns across a Spanish blockade to sell to Mindanao Moros. The purchases of these weapons were paid for by the Moros in slaves in addition to other goods. The main group of people selling guns were the Chinese in Sulu. The Chinese took control of the economy and used steamers to ship goods for exporting and importing. Opium, ivory, textiles, and crockery were among the other goods which the Chinese sold. The Chinese on Maimbung sent the weapons to the Sulu Sultanate, who used them to battle the Spanish and resist their attacks. A Chinese-Mestizo was one of the Sultan's brothers-in-law, the Sultan was married to his sister. He and the Sultan both owned shares in the ship (named the Far East) which helped smuggle weapons.

The Spanish launched a surprise offensive under Colonel Juan Arolas in April 1887 by attacking the sultanate's capital at Maimbung in an effort to crush resistance. Weapons were captured and the property of the Chinese were destroyed while the Chinese were deported to Jolo. By 1878, the Spanish had fortified Jolo with a perimeter wall and tower gates, built inner forts called Puerta Blockaus, Puerta España and Puerta Alfonso XII, and two outer fortifications named Princesa de Asturias and Torre de la Reina. Troops, including a cavalry with its own lieutenant commander, were garrisoned within the protective confine of the walls. In 1880, Rafael Gonzales de Rivera, who was appointed the governor, dispatched the 6th Regiment to govern Siasi and Bongao islands.

American colonization 

After the Spanish–American War, Spain ceded to the United States administration of the Philippine archipelago, which included Sulu and Mindanao, by the 1898 Treaty of Paris. At the beginning of their administration, American officials began about suppressing any remaining violence in the Moro areas. The problem of "Juramentados" persisted in the early 20th century but was eventually successfully stopped by the Americans.

Japanese occupation 
The Moros fought against the Japanese occupation of Mindanao and Sulu during World War II and eventually drove them out. Also when the Japanese occupied the northern Borneo area, they also helped their relatives there in a struggle to fight off the Japanese where many of them, including women and children, were massacred after their revolt with the Chinese had been foiled by the Japanese.

Modern days

In the modern day Philippines

Philippine government policies 
After gaining independence from the United States, the Moro population, which was isolated from the mainstream and experienced discrimination by the Philippine government, added to the fact that they were now governed by what they view as the former foot soldiers of Spain, their ancestral lands given away to settlers and corporations by land-tenure Laws, arming the settlers as militia in Mindanao, Filipinisation was a government policy which eventually gave rise to armed secession movements. Thus, the struggle for independence has been in existence for several centuries, starting from the Spanish period, the Moro rebellion during the United States occupation and up to the present day. Modern-day Moro conflict began in the 1960s. During the period, the Philippine government envisioned a new country in which Christian and Moro would be assimilated into the dominant culture. This vision, however, was generally rejected by both groups, the Christians remembering stories from Spanish foot soldiers of how fierce the Moro was, and the Moro remembering the Christian as aiding its hated Spanish enemy for 300 years. These two prejudices continue to this day. Because of this, the National government realized that there was a need for a specialized agency to deal with the Moro community, so it set up the Commission for National Integration (CNI) in the 1960s, which was later replaced by the Office of Muslim Affairs, and Cultural Communities (OMACC) and later on as OMA.

As they thought, concessions were made to the Moro after the creation of these agencies, with the Moro population receiving exemptions from national laws prohibiting polygamy and divorce which the Moro has already been exercising. In 1977, the Philippine government made another palliative attempt to move a step further by harmonizing Moro customary law with the national law which has no bearing at all for the Moro. Naturally, most of these achievements were seen as superficial. The Moro, still dissatisfied with the past Philippine governments' policies and misunderstanding established a first separatist group known as the Moro National Liberation Front (MNLF) led by Nur Misuari with the intention of creating an independent country. This initiated the modern Moro conflict in the Philippines, which still persists, and has since deepened the fractures between Muslims, Christians, and people of other religions. The MNLF is the only recognized representative organization for the Muslims of the Philippines by the Organisation of the Islamic Cooperation (OIC). By the 1970s, a paramilitary organization created by settler mayors in collusion with the Philippine Constabulary, mainly of armed Hiligaynon-speaking Christian settler residents of mainland Mindanao, called the Ilagas began operating in Cotabato originating from settler communities. In response, Moro volunteers with minimal weapons also group themselves with much old traditional weapons like the kris, spears and barong, such as the Blackshirts of Cotabato and the Barracudas of Lanao, began to appear and engage the Ilagas. The Armed Forces of the Philippines were also deployed; however, their presence only seemed to create more violence and reports that the Army and the settler militia are helping each other. A Zamboangan version of the Ilagas, the Mundo Oscuro (Spanish for Dark World), was also organized in Zamboanga and Basilan.

In 1981, internal divisions within the MNLF caused the establishment of an Islamic paramilitary breakaway organization called the Moro Islamic Liberation Front (MILF). The group continued the conflict when the MNLF signed a Peace Deal with the Philippine Government in 1994. It has now become the biggest and most organized Moro armed group in Mindanao and Sulu. The Moro Islamic Liberation Front is now on the final stages of the required annexe for the Framework Agreement on the Bangsamoro that has a set time-frame for full implementation in 2016.

Autonomy 

Although initialed in a 1976 ceasefire, come 1987 as a fall out of the EDSA revolution, peace talks with the MNLF picked up pace with the intention of establishing an autonomous region for Muslims in Mindanao. On 1 August 1989, through Republic Act No. 6734, known as the Organic Act, a 1989 plebiscite was held in 18 provinces in Mindanao, the Sulu Archipelago and Palawan without considering the effects of continuous migration by settlers from Luzón and the Visayas. This was said to determine if the residents would still want to be part of an Autonomous Region. Out of all the Provinces and cities participating in the plebiscite, only four provinces opted to join, namely: Maguindanao, Lanao del Sur, Sulu and Tawi-Tawi. Even its regional capital, Cotabato City, rejected joining the autonomous region as the settlers has now greatly outnumbered the Moro and Lumad. When before they were a majority, they have now become a minority. This still led to the creation of the ARMM, however. A second plebiscite, held a year more in 2001, managed to include Basilan (except its capital, Isabela City) and Marawi City in the autonomous region. Of the original 13 provinces agreed on the Final Peace Agreement (FPA) with the MNLF, only 5 has now been included in the present-day ARMM due to the continuous settler program of the Republic of the Philippines that started in the earnest of 1901.

The ARMM is headed by a regional governor as the outcome of the Final Peace Agreement between the MNLF and the Philippine government in 1996 under President Fidel Ramos. The regional governor, with the regional-vice governor, act as the executive branch and are served by a Regional Cabinet, composed of regional secretaries, mirroring national government agencies of the Philippines. The ARMM has a unicameral Regional Assembly headed by a speaker. This acts as the legislative branch for the region and is responsible for regional ordinances. It is composed of three members for every congressional district. The current membership is twenty-four. Some of the Regional Assembly's acts have since been nullified by the Supreme Court on grounds that they are "unconstitutional". An example is the nullification of the creation of the Province of Shariff Kabungsuwan by the Regional Legislative Assembly (RLA) as this will create an extra seat in the Philippines Congress' House of Representatives, a power reserved solely for the Philippine Congress — Senate and House jointly — to decide on. Some would say, that this proves in itself the fallacy of its Autonomy granted by the Central Government during the Peace Process.

Current situation 

The Moros had a history of resistance against Spanish, American, and Japanese rule for over 400 years. The armed struggle against the Spanish, Americans, Japanese and Filipinos is considered by present Moro leaders as part of the four centuries long "sovereign based conflict" of the Bangsamoro (Moro Nation). The 400-year-long resistance against the Japanese, Americans, and Spanish by the Moro persisted and morphed into their current war for independence against the Philippine state. Some Moros have formed their own separatist organisations such as the MNLF, MILF and become a members of more extreme groups such as the Abu Sayyaf (ASG) and Jemaah Islamiyah (JI) and the latest formed is Bangsamoro Islamic Freedom Fighter ( BIFF).

The Moro Islamic Liberation Front boycotted the original referendum formed by the Organic Act referendum and continued their armed struggle until present. However, it remains a partner to the peace process, with the Philippines unwilling to brand MILF as a "terrorist" group. Today, the Moro people had become marginalises and a minority in Mindanao, they are also disadvantaged than majority Christians in terms of employment and housing; they are also discriminated. Due to this, it has established escalating tensions that have contributed to the ongoing conflict between the Philippine government and the Moro people. In addition, there has been a large exodus of Moro peoples comprising the Tausūg, Samal, Bajau, Illanun and Maguindanao to Malaysia (Sabah) and Indonesia (North Kalimantan) since the 1970s, due to the illegal annexation of their land by the Catholic majority in certain regions, and armed Settler militias such as the Ilaga which has destroyed the trust between Mindanao Settlers and Moro communities. Further, Land Tenure Laws have changed the population statistics of the Bangsamoro to a significant degree and has caused the gradual displacement of the Moros from their traditional lands.

2014 Draft Bangsamoro Basic Law 

The office of the Presidential Adviser on the Peace Process has posted a set of frequently asked questions about the Bangsamoro Basic Law (BBL), the draft of which President Benigno Aquino III submitted to Congress leaders. The Bangsamoro Basic Law abolishes the Autonomous Region in Muslim Mindanao and establishes the new Bangsamoro political identity in its place. The law is based on the Comprehensive Agreement on the Bangsamoro signed by the Philippine government and the Moro Islamic Liberation Front in March 2014. It is still to be implemented by the Government by Congressional mandate.

In Malaysia 

Due to their conflict in the southern Philippines, many Moros have emigrated to the Malaysian state of Sabah since the 1970s in search of better lives because of the close proximity between Sulu islands and the state of Sabah. Most of them are illegal immigrants and live in squalor, thus the Sabah state government are working to relocate them into a proper settlement to ease management.

Bangsa Sug and Bangsa Moro 
In 2018, a unification gathering of all the sultans of the Sulu archipelago and representatives from all ethnic communities in the Sulu archipelago commenced in Zamboanga City, declaring themselves as the Bangsa Sug peoples and separating them from the Bangsa Moro peoples of mainland central Mindanao. They cited the complete difference in cultures and customary ways of life they have with the central Mindanao Muslims as the primary reason for their separation. They also called the government to establish a separate Philippine state, called Bangsa Sug, from mainland Bangsa Moro or to incorporate the Sulu archipelago to whatever state is formed in the Zamboanga peninsula, if ever federalism in the Philippines is approved in the coming years.

See also
 Ethnic groups in the Philippines
Juramentado
Taming (shield)
Young Moro Professionals Council
Maguindanao people
Maranao people
Iranun people
Lumad
Tagalog people
Tausūg people
Kapampangan people
Ilocano people
Ivatan people
Igorot people
Pangasinan people
Bicolano people
Negrito
Visayan peopleCebuano peopleBoholano people Hiligaynon peopleWaray people

References

Further reading 
 
 The Moro struggle as myth and as historical reality (archive link) by Patricio N. Abinales of the Rappler
 The Bangsamoro Struggle for Self-Determination by Guiamel M. Alim of the Centre for Southeast Asian Studies
 The "Moro Problem" in the Philippines: Three Perspectives City University of Hong Kong (CityU)
 The Moro Conflict and the Philippine Experience with Autonomy Australian National University (ANU)

External links 

Moro nationalists/separatists:
 Moro National Liberation Front
 Moro Islamic Liberation Front

Moro websites:
 Bangsamoro.com Bangsamoro Online
 Moro Herald Bangsamoro News, History, Tradition, Politics, and Social Commentary
 Moro Bloggers

 
Islam in the Philippines
Muslim communities of the Philippines
Ethnoreligious groups in Asia
Ethnic groups in the Philippines
Refugees in Malaysia
Refugees in Indonesia
Refugees in Brunei